is a Japanese manga artist from Tokyo. He has won several awards, including the Shogakukan Manga Award, the Tezuka Osamu Cultural Prize and Eisner Award. Ping Pong and Blue Spring have been adapted into live-action feature films. Animation studio Studio 4°C adapted Tekkonkinkreet into an animated feature film, it was released in Japan in late 2006, and both the anime and manga have been published in English. He is the cousin of Santa Inoue, another manga artist.

Career
Matsumoto originally wanted to be a soccer player, but changed to artist as an occupation instead. After his initial success in the Comic Open contest, he began touring France in 1986, an event that became a significant point in his career. The manga he produced covers a variety of topics, from sports to family comedies to science fiction epics.

In 1993, he began work on the Tekkonkinkreet manga, which became a success in the Big Spirits magazine, and published a series of short stories in a collection called Nihon no Kyodai that was publicized at the time by Comic Aré magazine. Ping Pong appeared in Big Spirits in 1996, soon followed by the series No. 5 in Shogakukan's Monthly Ikki magazine in 2000.

The Tekkonkinkreet anime was released in Japan in late 2006, and both the anime and manga have been published in English.

Influences
Matsumoto has cited Moebius, Enki Bilal, Katsuhiro Otomo, Shotaro Ishinomori and Tsuchida Seiki as influences on his work.

Works

References

External links

Taiyo Matsumoto listing at Shogakukan 
 

Taiyō Matsumoto
Manga artists from Tokyo
Living people
People from Tokyo
1967 births